Phycita meliella is a moth of the family Pyralidae described by Josef Johann Mann in 1864. It is found in Italy, Slovenia, the Czech Republic, Slovakia, Hungary, Croatia, Bosnia and Herzegovina, Albania, North Macedonia, Greece, Bulgaria, Romania and Turkey.

Adults are on wing from June to August.

References

External links

lepiforum.de

Moths described in 1864
Phycitini
Moths of Europe
Moths of Asia